Arthur German (28 June 1905 – 2 February 1968) was an English cricketer.  German was a right-handed batsman.  He was born at Ashby-de-la-Zouch, Leicestershire, and was educated at Repton School.

German made his first-class debut for Leicestershire against Sussex at the County Ground, Hove, in the 1923 County Championship.  He made two further first-class appearances for Leicestershire the following season, against Surrey at The Oval, and Essex at Aylestone Road, Leicester.  In his three first-class matches, he scored a total of 73 runs at an average of 12.16, with a high score of 36.

He died at Aberdeen, Scotland on 2 February 1968.  His uncle, Harry German, also played first-class cricket for Leicestershire.

References

External links
Arthur German at ESPNcricinfo
Arthur German at CricketArchive

1905 births
1968 deaths
People from Ashby-de-la-Zouch
Cricketers from Leicestershire
People educated at Repton School
English cricketers
Leicestershire cricketers